This is a list of universities in Egypt. The higher education sector of Egypt includes a number of state-funded, national and private universities.

State-funded

National universities

Private universities

See also
Education in Egypt
List of University Institutions in the New Administrative Capital of Egypt [In addition to the listed public, national and private universities in Egypt, international / transnational university institutions were founded in the New Administrative Capital after 2016, hosting branches of internationally recognized universities from outside Egypt. These institutions include - in alphabetical order - EUE (European Universities in Egypt), GAF (Global Academic Foundation), TKH (The Knowledge Hub), and others.]
List of medical schools in Egypt

References

 
Universities
Egypt
Egypt